Park Street station may refer to:

 Park Street metro station (Kolkata) in Kolkata, India 
 Park Street railway station (England), in Hertfordshire, England
 Parkville station (Connecticut) (known as Park Street during planning) in Hartford, Connecticut, US
 Park Street station (MBTA), in Boston, Massachusetts, US

See also
 Park Street (disambiguation)
 Park Place station (disambiguation)